The Parker Dawson 26 is an American trailerable sailboat that was designed by Robert Finch as a cruiser and first built in 1972.

The design has been sold by a number of different manufacturers under several names, including the Midship 25, Dawson 25, Nauset 26 and Bombay 26.

The Parker Dawson 26 is a development of the Dawson 26.

Production
The design was built by Midship Yacht Company and Parker Dawson Yachts, as well as other builders in the United States. About 200 were built by Midship between 1972 and 1974, then Parker Dawson built it from 1973 to 1982. Approximately 300 were completed by all manufacturers by the mid-1980s, but it is now out of production.

Midship Yachts was located in California, but later moved to Las Vegas, Nevada. Parker Dawson Yachts was located in Massachusetts.

Design
The Parker Dawson 26 is a recreational keelboat, built predominantly of fiberglass, with wood trim. It has a masthead sloop rig, although some were built as ketches, a raked stem, a vertical transom, a lifting transom-hung rudder controlled by a wheel or geared tiller and a lifting or fixed fin keel. It displaces  and carries  of ballast.

The lifting keel version has a 50:1 worm gear to raise the keel. The rudder raises and lowers in an aluminum mounting frame.

The design has an unusual configuration for a boat of its size, with a cabin forward and one aft, with a center cockpit. The aft cabin has two bunks and a sink, with space for a portable or marine head. The forward cabin is located with the main cabin, as there are no internal bulkheads in the hull. The head is located under the starboard settee which can be used as a berth. There is a removable dinette table. The galley in the main cabin is to port. There are four fixed portlights in the forward cabin, while the aft cabin has two fixed ports and one that opens.

The boat has a hinged mast, mounted on the forward cabin roof. There are two jib sheet winches and one for the halyards and an anchor locker forward.

Operational history
The design has been sailed across the Atlantic Ocean single-handedly.

In a 2010 review Steve Henkel wrote, "this pocket cruiser is unique in several respects: (1) she has two separate cabins plus a center cockpit, which can be enclosed in canvas to serve as a third cabin; (2) a fixed-keel version with beefed-up rigging has crossed the Atlantic and a good part of the Pacific, indicating at least a smidgen of seaworthiness; and (3) she is trailerable and ramp-launchable despite her relatively heavy displacement for her size—provided your truck or SUV can handle 8,000 pound loads. A variety of options were available from various marketers (Midship Yachts, Dawson, Parker-Dawson, Nauset Marine, others) who offered at various times inboard diesel, inboard gas, and outboard power; fixed shoal keel or swing keel; wheel or tiller steering; and sloop rig or ketch. Best features: The privacy that comes with two cabins and two heads is a great plus, especially if guests are aboard. Worst features: Speed is said to be so-so in light and medium air. Owners have complained about a lack of helm feel and drag on early models; later boats were given push-pull cable steering gear rather than the pull-pull variety, which evidently solved the problem. Rudder scabbards, originally of aluminum, were switched to fiberglass to eliminate rudder banging at moorings. And the swing keel can bang around in its trunk unless pinned in place, which owners sometimes forget to do."

See also
List of sailing boat types

Related development
Dawson 26

Similar sailboats
Beneteau First 26
Beneteau First 265
C&C 26
C&C 26 Wave
Contessa 26
Discovery 7.9
Grampian 26
Herreshoff H-26
Hunter 26
Hunter 26.5
Hunter 260
Hunter 270
MacGregor 26
Mirage 26
Nash 26
Nonsuch 26
Outlaw 26
Paceship PY 26
Pearson 26
Sandstream 26
Tanzer 26
Yamaha 26

References

Keelboats
1980s sailboat type designs
Sailing yachts
Trailer sailers
Sailboat type designs by Robert Finch
Sailboat types built by Parker Dawson Yachts
Sailboat types built by Midship Yacht Company